The Auckland Youth Symphonic Band Incorporated  (AYSB (Inc)) is an incorporated society that runs both the Auckland Youth Symphonic Band (AYSB) and the Auckland Wind Orchestra (AWO), both based in Auckland, New Zealand.

About 
The AYSB and AWO are both community concert bands based in Auckland, New Zealand.  The AYSB primarily consists of members from year 7 (age 12) to university age, while members of the AWO are typically of university age to adults.  Instruments in both groups include: piccolo, flute, oboe, clarinet (including bass clarinet), bassoon, saxophone, French horn, trumpet, trombone, euphonium, tuba, orchestral percussion and drum kit.

Repertoire and Performances
Both bands play a variety of music, including classical transcriptions, folk tunes, film music, musicals, dance accompaniments and dances, and original compositions.  There is a focus, however, on dedicated Concert Band repertoire.  This has changed somewhat from the band's early days of primarily light music and marches.

Both bands typically play in concerts in Auckland as standalone performances, however do often combine.  Occasionally, they have performed as a part of a larger event.

History
The Auckland Youth Symphonic Band was established in 1967 by Hugh Dixon, as an opportunity for amateur woodwind and brass musicians to perform in a group after dissatisfaction with orchestral parts.

In 1970, the Band was renamed from the Auckland Junior Symphonic Band (AJSB) to the Auckland Youth Symphonic Band (AYSB) and in 1971, became an Incorporated society.

The Junior Division was formed in 1973 after the number of players reached 86.  This was called the Junior Division (as opposed to the Senior Division) of the AYSB.
In 1974, an ensemble consisting of flute and clarinet players was formed, under the direction of Tony Webster.  This was disbanded in 1975.

In 1980 the Senior Division toured Singapore, and in 1986 the Junior Division toured Fiji.  In 1988, the Junior Division played in Brisbane, for the 1988 World Expo.  In 1998, the AYSB travelled to Australia to perform in the 21st Manly International Jazz Festival.

In 1999, the Senior Division of the AYSB was renamed to the Auckland Wind Orchestra.

Conductors

Auckland Wind Orchestra
 1967–1977 Hugh Dixon
 1977–1989? Don Carpenter
 1989–1994 David Adlam
 1994–1999 Jim Allen
 1998–2003 Peter Thomas
 2001–2008 Adrian Raven, Peter Thomas, Andrew Marshall, John Rimmer, Opeloge Ah Sam, Ashley Hopkins
 2008–2009 Ewan Clark
 2009–2010 Ryan Youens 
 2011–2015 Hamish Arthur
 2016–2021 Oliver Gilmour
 2021-present Alex Eichelbaum

Auckland Youth Symphonic Band
 1973–1975 Martin Heath
 1975–1977 David Adlam
 1977 David Savigny
 1977–2018 Rod McLeay
 2018–present Michael Jamieson

Flute and Clarinet Ensemble
 1974–1975 Tony Webster

References

External links 
 Auckland Wind Orchestra website
 Auckland Youth Symphonic Band website

Concert bands
Musical groups from Auckland
Musical groups established in 1967
Wind bands
New Zealand classical music groups